Francisco Arce y Romero (ca. 1822 – ca. 1902) was an interim Corregidor Mayor of Ponce, Puerto Rico, in 1872. Eduardo Neumann Gandia describes him as an honest man, politically liberal and open minded.

See also

List of mayors of Ponce, Puerto Rico
List of Puerto Ricans

References

Further reading
 Socorro Girón. Ponce, el teatro La Perla y La Campana de la Almudaina. Gobierno Municipal de Ponce. 1992.

Mayors of Ponce, Puerto Rico
1820s births
1900s deaths
Year of birth uncertain
Year of death uncertain